Cannon Beach is a city in Clatsop County, Oregon, United States. Its population was 1,690 at the 2010 census. It is a popular coastal Oregon tourist destination, famous for Haystack Rock, a  sea stack that juts out along the coast. In 2013, National Geographic listed it as "one of the world’s 100 most beautiful places."

History

Cannon Beach and its surrounding coast was previously settled by the  Tillamook people.

William Clark, one of the leaders of the Lewis and Clark Expedition, journeyed to Cannon Beach in early 1805. In December 1805, two members of the expedition returned to camp with blubber from a whale that had beached several miles south, near the mouth of Ecola Creek. Clark later explored the region himself. From a spot near the western cliffs of the headland he saw "...the grandest and most pleasing prospects which my eyes ever surveyed, in front of a boundless Ocean..." That viewpoint, later dubbed "Clark's Point of View," can be accessed by a hiking trail from Indian Beach in Ecola State Park.

Clark and several of his companions, including Sacagawea, completed a three-day journey on January 10, 1806, to the site of the beached whale. They encountered a group of Tillamook who were boiling blubber for storage. 
There is a whale sculpture commemorating the encounter between Clark's group and the Tillamooks in a small park at the northern end of Hemlock Street.

Clark applied the name Ekoli to what is now Ecola Creek. Ehkoli is a Chinook word for "whale". Early settlers later renamed the creek "Elk Creek", and a community with the same name formed nearby.

In 1846, a cannon from the US Navy schooner Shark, which had sunk earlier that year, washed ashore just north of Arch Cape, a few miles south of the community. The schooner hit land while attempting to cross the Columbia Bar, also known as the "Graveyard of the Pacific." The cannon, rediscovered in 1898, eventually inspired a name change for the growing community. In 1922, Elk Creek was renamed Cannon Beach (reflecting the  beach that extends south of Ecola Creek to Arch Cape) at the insistence of the Post Office Department because the name was frequently confused with Eola. Elk Creek itself was renamed Ecola Creek to honor William Clark's original name.

The cannon is now housed in the city's museum and a replica of it can be seen alongside U.S. Route 101. Two more cannons, also believed to have been from the Shark, were discovered on Arch Cape over the weekend of February 16, 2008.

U.S. Highway 101 formerly ran through Cannon Beach. In 1964, a tsunami generated by the Good Friday earthquake came ashore along the coast of the Pacific Northwest. The subsequent flooding inundated parts of Cannon Beach and washed away the highway bridge located on the north side of city. The city, now isolated from the highway, decided to attract visitors by holding a sand castle contest, an event that still continues annually every June.

Geography
The Tolovana Park neighborhood is south of the downtown core, adjacent to Tolovana Beach State Recreation Site.

Climate
This region experiences mild, dry summers, with no average monthly temperatures above . According to the Köppen Climate Classification system, Cannon Beach has a warm-summer Mediterranean climate, abbreviated "Csb" on climate maps.

Demographics

2010 census

As of the census of 2010, there were 1,690 people, 759 households, and 415 families residing in the city. The racial makeup of the city was 88.4% White, 0.1% African American, 0.4% Native American, 0.4% Asian, 0.2% Pacific Islander, 9.1% from other races, and 1.5% from two or more races. Hispanic or Latino of any race were 12.7% of the population.

There were 759 households, of which 19.1% had children under the age of 18 living with them, 45.1% were married couples living together, 7.4% had a female householder with no husband present, 2.2% had a male householder with no wife present, and 45.3% were non-families. 38.1% of all households were made up of individuals, and 13.3% had someone living alone who was 65 years of age or older. The average household size was 2.07 and the average family size was 2.70.

The median age in the city was 46.4 years. 16.4% of residents were under the age of 18; 12.3% were between the ages of 18 and 24; 20% were from 25 to 44; 31.6% were from 45 to 64; and 19.8% were 65 years of age or older. The gender makeup of the city was 46.0% male and 54.0% female.

2000 census
As of the census of 2000, there were 1,588 people, 710 households, and 418 families residing in the city. The population density was 1,066.8 people per square mile (411.5/km2). There were 1,641 housing units at an average density of 1,102.4 per square mile (425.2/km2). The racial makeup of the city was 92.57% White, 0.19% African American, 0.88% Native American, 0.31% Asian, 3.27% from other races, and 2.77% from two or more races. Hispanic or Latino of any race were 10.52% of the population. 17.2% were of German, 12.6% English, 11.4% Irish and 5.7% American ancestry according to Census 2000.

There were 710 households, out of which 20.8% had children under the age of 18 living with them, 49.0% were married couples living together, 7.3% had a female householder with no husband present, and 41.0% were non-families. 33.5% of all households were made up of individuals, and 13.0% had someone living alone who was 65 years of age or older. The average household size was 2.11 and the average family size was 2.70.

In the city, the population was spread out, with 17.4% under the age of 18, 12.3% from 18 to 24, 21.5% from 25 to 44, 32.1% from 45 to 64, and 16.7% who were 65 years of age or older. The median age was 44 years. For every 100 females, there were 86.8 males. For every 100 females age 18 and over, there were 84.4 males.

The median income for a household in the city was $39,271, and the median income for a family was $45,329. Males had a median income of $31,250 versus $21,641 for females. The per capita income for the city was $24,465. About 8.2% of families and 12.0% of the population were below the poverty line, including 16.3% of those under age 18 and 2.1% of those age 65 or over.

Economy
Cannon Beach is a tourist resort destination, particularly popular as a weekend getaway with residents from Portland, Oregon.

Chain stores such as Safeway and McDonald's have been discouraged from building in Cannon Beach in order to preserve the local economy and small-town feel.

Artisan shops and local restaurants line the streets of the town.

Arts and culture

Annual cultural events
In June, the city hosts an annual sand castle-building contest.

The city also hosts an annual Fourth of July parade. Parades in recent years have featured a military flyover and a "Lawn Chair Brigade".

"Spring Unveiling" is an annual arts festival, held on the first Sunday in May, hosted by the city's galleries.

There is an annual late-fall festival called the Stormy Weather Arts Festival, held in November, where artists from across the Pacific Northwest showcase their artwork in the local galleries. Artwork is available for purchase in an auction held at the end of the event.

Several galleries in town feature the works of local and Northwest artists.

Parks and recreation

Cannon Beach is recognized by the well-known landmark Haystack Rock, located southwest of downtown Cannon Beach. There is a small cave system that penetrates its   igneous rock that can be seen from the coastline. The rock is also protected as part of Oregon Islands National Wildlife Refuge and events are not allowed within  of either side of the rock. Near Haystack Rock are the Needles, two tall rocks rising straight out of the water.

Four parks can be found within city limits: Haystack Hill State Park, Les Shirley Park, John Yeon State Natural Site (closed to visitors), and Tolovana Beach State Recreation Site.

Media and film
The Cannon Beach Gazette, a local newspaper that covers area politics, news, sports and community events, is published bi-weekly on every other Thursday of the month. The paper is owned and operated by Country Media Inc.

Cannon Beach and Ecola State Park have appeared in several films, including The Goonies (1985), Free Willy (1993), Twilight (2008), Hysterical (1983), and Point Break (1991).

Filmography

Transportation
The main road through Cannon Beach is Hemlock Street, which runs from the north end of the city to the south, through Tolovana Park. Both ends of the street connect to U.S. Highway 101.

A shuttle runs from the north of Cannon Beach to the south. This shuttle runs a loop that connects Cannon Beach and Seaside every hour and costs $1 (as of February 2013).

The NorthWest POINT runs between Cannon Beach and Union Station in Portland; tickets can be booked through Amtrak.

References

External links

 Entry for Cannon Beach in the Oregon Blue Book
 City of Cannon Beach official website
 Cannon Beach Chamber of Commerce

1922 establishments in Oregon
Beaches of Oregon
Cities in Clatsop County, Oregon
Cities in Oregon
Landforms of Clatsop County, Oregon
Oregon Coast
Populated coastal places in Oregon
Seaside resorts in Oregon
Astoria, Oregon micropolitan area